Jackson Municipal Airport may refer to:

 Jackson Municipal Airport (Alabama) in Jackson, Alabama, United States
 Jackson Municipal Airport (Minnesota) in Jackson, Minnesota, United States